Simon Beck (born 20 December 1947) is a Liechtensteiner luger. He competed in the men's singles event at the 1968 Winter Olympics.

References

External links
 

1947 births
Living people
Liechtenstein male lugers
Olympic lugers of Liechtenstein
Lugers at the 1968 Winter Olympics